Abid Kadhim (1 January 1942 – 5 January 2005) was an Iraqi football defender who played for the Iraq national football team in the 1972 AFC Asian Cup. He played for Iraq between 1965 and 1974.

Kadhim was the captain of the Al Shorta football club. He captained the national team for the first time in a World Cup qualifier 

Kadhim died on 5 January 2005.

References

External links
علي كاظم جلاد حراس المرمى (in Arabic)

2005 deaths
Iraqi footballers
Iraq international footballers
1972 AFC Asian Cup players
Al-Shorta SC players
Al-Shorta SC managers
Association football defenders
1942 births
Iraqi football managers